Grove City College v. Bell, 465 U.S. 555 (1984), was a case in which the United States Supreme Court held that Title IX, which applies only to colleges and universities that receive federal funds, could be applied to a private school that refused direct federal funding but for which a large number of students had received federally funded scholarships. The Court also held that the federal government could require a statutorily mandated "assurance of compliance" with Title IX even though no evidence had been presented to suggest that Grove City College had discriminated. However, the Court also held that the regulation would apply only to the institution's financial aid department, not to the school as a whole.

Opinion of the court
Justice Byron White delivered the opinion of the Court, which was unanimous except for Part III.

In an opinion by White, joined by Chief Justice Warren Burger and Harry Blackmun, Lewis Powell, William Rehnquist, and Sandra Day O'Connor, it was held that (1) Title IX applied to the college, even though it accepted no direct assistance, since it did enroll students who received BEOGs, (2) for Title IX enforcement purposes, the education program or activity at the college receiving federal financial assistance was the college's financial aid program, and not the entire college, (3) federal assistance to the college's financial aid program could be terminated solely because the college had refused to execute an assurance of compliance with Title IX, and (4) the application of Title IX to the college did not infringe the First Amendment rights of the college or its students.

Concurring and dissenting opinions
Lewis Franklin Powell Jr. joined by Chief Justice Warren Burger and Sandra Day O'Connor, concurred, expressing the view that the above holdings were dictated by the language and legislative history of Title IX and the regulations of the Department of Education.

John Paul Stevens concurred in part and concurred in the result, stating that he was unable to join in holding 2 above because he considered it an advisory opinion unnecessary to the overall decision and because it was predicated on speculation rather than evidence.

William Brennan joined by Thurgood Marshall concurred in part and dissented in part, expressing the view that the program-specific language in Title IX was designed to insure that the reach of the statute is dependent upon the scope of federal financial assistance provided to the college, so that when the financial assistance is clearly intended to serve as federal aid for the entire college, the college as a whole should be covered by the prohibition on sex discrimination.

Overturning of decision
The holding that compliance with Title IX is necessary only in the particular programs or activities that receive federal funding was abrogated when the United States Congress subsequently passed the Civil Rights Restoration Act of 1987, which specified that recipients of federal funds must comply with civil rights laws in all areas.

See also
 List of United States Supreme Court cases, volume 465
 Civil Rights Restoration Act of 1987

Further reading

Pittsburgh Press analysis

External links
 

United States Supreme Court cases
United States Supreme Court cases of the Burger Court
1984 in United States case law
Grove City College
Abrogated United States Supreme Court decisions